The clandestine press of the French Resistance was collectively responsible for printing flyers, broadsheets, newspapers, and even books in secret in France during the German occupation of France in the Second World War.

History 

Counterpropaganda such as leaflets, broadsheets (such as the first pages of the ), brochures, posters, and clandestine newspapers began to appear in France.
In September 1941, German police in Paris reported discovering leaflets written in German and co-signed by the Communist Parties of Germany (KPD) and Austria (KPÖ).
On 10 July 1942, General Karl Oberg posted a notice in every town hall in the Occupied zone announcing penalties applicable to the families of anyone convicted of disseminating propaganda against the occupying force (writers, typographers, middlemen, distributors), recalling ancient German Sippenhaft-style collective punishment measures. These measures didn't stop the spread of information by the Resistance, and by 1944, 1,200 underground newspaper titles were being published with a total circulation of two million copies, totaling nearly twelve million copies over the course of the war.

The first French underground newspapers emerged in opposition to German and Vichy control over French radio and newspapers. In the German-occupied zone, the first underground titles to emerge were Pantagruel and Libre France, which both began in Paris in October 1940. In Vichy France, the first title to emerge was Liberté in November 1940. Few produced issues for both German and Vichy zones, though Libération was an early exception. In early newspaper issues, individuals often wrote under a number of pseudonyms in the same issue to convey the impression that a team of individuals was working on a newspaper. Initially underground newspapers represented a wide range of political opinions but, by 1944, had generally converged in support of Gaullist Free French in the United Kingdom.

The four major clandestine newspapers during the German occupation were Défense de la France, Résistance, Combat and Libération. Défense de la France was founded by a group of parisian students in the summer of 1941. After the invasion of the Soviet Union, these were joined by a number of communist publications including L'Humanité and Verité. These newspapers were anti-Nazi propaganda, but practiced propaganda themselves by misreporting events, and glorifying and enlarging Allied victories. The reporting in these newspapers was often subjective, as they aimed to capture and shape public opinion rather than accurately represent it. The extent to which underground newspapers actually affected French popular opinion under the occupation is disputed by historians.

Profession-specific newspapers also existed. Le Médecin Français advised doctors to immediately approve known collaborators for Service du travail obligatoire while medically disqualifying everyone else. La Terre advised farmers on how to send food to resistance members. Bulletin des Chemins de Fer encouraged railroad workers to sabotage German transportation. Unter Uns ("Among Us"), published in German for the occupiers, printed stories of German defeats on the eastern front.

A small number of underground presses were also active in printing illegal books and works of literature. The most notable example of this was Le Silence de la mer by Jean Bruller published illegally in Paris in 1942. This marked its publisher, "Les Éditions de Minuit", as an emerging clandestine publisher of Resistance material; they later became a successful commercial literary publisher in post-war France.

The Bibliothèque nationale de France (BnF) began a project in 2012 to digitise surviving French underground newspapers. By 2015, 1,350 titles had been uploaded on its Gallica platform.

Censorship and repression 

Censorship in France was the enemy of the underground press during the Second World War. Under the German occupation and the laws of the Vichy regime, freedoms of the French people were suppressed, particularly with the end of freedom of the press. The decree-law of 24 August 1939 authorising seizure of newspapers and their suppression as well as the official establishment of censorship on 27 August led to the disappearance of newspapers which had been denouncing the German occupation.
The only media that survived under the occupation were ones that served the propaganda needs of the German occupier and of Vichy.

It also spelled the end of freedom of speech, and any citizen caught reading the foreign press or listening to foreign radio were judged as opponents and enemies of the regime.

The occupying force and the police paid particular attention to counterpropaganda printed matter from the outset. One of the first missions of the police was to discover clandestine newspaper printing locations, and their leaders. The first arrests were therefore those of journalists involved in counterpropaganda such as Jean-Baptiste Lebas, who launched "" (The Free Man) and who died after being deported, or Claude Bourdet, director of the clandestine newspaper Combat arrested in March 1944. Out of 1200 workers  400 were killed (deported, decapitated, shot).

Printing and distribution methods 

In the face of repression, underground newspapers faced many problems with supplies. Paper, ink and typewriters were scarce, expensive and their sale was meticulously controlled. Printing centres were also few and far between and were used for propaganda newspapers.

The first clandestine newspapers were therefore handwritten with very few copies. However, two processes were useful for clandestine production: the "roneo" Gestetner and the spirit duplicator, which was small in size and therefore easy to transport and hide. It was operated by a small crank handle, and could print between 700 and 800 copies per hour.

Everything was done with the utmost secrecy governments and also of people not involved in the clandestine work. The penalties for being involved in the printing and distribution of a resistance newspaper were very strict.

For the delivery and distribution of newspapers, Resistance members assumed the risk of being arrested and imprisoned. From the beginning, railway workers played an essential role in long-distance transport. The bicycle was also one of the best means of transport for delivering printed material. Other means were also used to distribute newspapers, allowing the anonymity of the distributors to be maintained: slipping the issues into letterboxes, under doors, or in a pocket, or dropping them on a bench or table.

In spite of strong repression and censorship nearly 1200 titles totaling over ten million copies of underground newspapers were printed between 1940 and 1944.

Radio Londres and the underground press 

After the Fall of France in 1940, the BBC opened its studio to the first members of the Resistance who fled Occupied France.  was born and would become the daily rendezvous of the French people for four years. It opened its transmission with, "" ("This is London. The French speaking to the French..."), now a very famous quote in France.  It was the voice of Free French Forces under Charles de Gaulle, who, on 18 June 1940, made his famous Appeal of 18 June, inviting his compatriots to resist the occupation, and rise up against it.

The press was constrained on French territory to considerable supply difficulties and strong political repression. Radio, which broadcast mainly from abroad, was not subject to the same forms of repression. Radio Londres, broadcast by the French section of the BBC seemed better placed to make the voice of the French Resistance heard and to have a psychological influence on the French. Its broadcasts could be listened to both throughout the country and within the homes themselves, but in 1940 there were only five million receivers and the transistor hadn't yet been invented. Moreover, the broadcasts only provided a view of events from the outside, and had limited knowledge of what was happening within French territory.

Radio London and the clandestine newspapers thus had complementary functions in their common objective of bringing as many French people as possible to the Resistance. The radio was able to reach the entirety of the French population, while the press had the mission of fighting directly on the home front until it was able to spread more and more to the territory as a whole.

Calling for resistance 

The content of clandestine newspapers focused exclusively on the motivations and nature of the Resistance struggle, and why it was necessary.

The duty to act is clearly stated in the first issue of Libération of July 1941 which stated that the newspaper per se is an action and that the situation can only be changed "by action and through action". Combat followed it by giving in January 1942 "guidelines for action".

There was only one cause common to all underground newspapers: to appeal to as many French people as possible to join the fight against the occupier, to "chase away the invader" as Libération wrote in August 1941, with the aim of liberating French territory. The first form of action targeted by the underground press was the call to read and circulate copies of the clandestine press. It also encouraged the reader to become a distributor. It was a form of "combat through words", as Combat wrote in December 1941. The situation at the time only allowed for resistance via verbal struggle. "We will take part in the crushing of Germany, even at the risk of our own lives," wrote the August 1941 issue of 

The clandestine press worked to counter the ideas of the Vichy regime and Nazis by taking up the key themes of the official propaganda. By 1943, the watchwords of the counterpropaganda struggle taken up by all of the underground press, were opposing the Service du travail obligatoire, the Nazi-imposed obligatory work program, and calling for demonstrations, strikes and sabotage of French-made goods destined for Germany.

Top-circulation titles

Combat 

The  ("Little Wings") appeared in the Forbidden Zone in the Nord-Pas-de-Calais department in northern France.
The group in the north was destroyed. Thanks to the structures put in place, circulation reached 1000 copies in 1943, and attained 5,000 with issue number 50 of 1 November 1943. and 30,000 in December 1943.

After the Liberation,  was led by Albert Ollivier,  and especially Pascal Pia, who dragged his friend Albert Camus there in the fall of 1943.
Jean-Paul Sartre, André Malraux,  and Emmanuel Mounier also contributed, and later Raymond Aron and Pierre Herbart.

Défense de la France 

A few Parisian students decided to found a clandestine newspaper to denounce the occupation of France. Benefiting from the support of industrialists and printers, the young Resistance fighters managed to produce an increasingly professional newspaper which ended up having the highest circulation of any underground paper as of January 1944.

The first issues were printed on a Rotaprint offset press hidden in the cellar of the Sorbonne, to which Hélène Viannay held the key as a volunteer fire fighter, with the following sentence from Blaise Pascal: "I only believe stories whose witnesses would have their throats cut".

Initially focused on non-violent action, the Resistance segued into armed operations in 1944. Despite setbacks dealt by the German and French police,  managed to print both its newspaper and those of other movements until the Liberation.

After Liberation, from 8 August on, the paper was printed in Rennes, on the presses of the newspaper Ouest-France, presenting itself as the "evening daily of the ".

Distributed by the networks Combat and Témoignage chrétien in Grenoble, Clermont-Ferrand, Lyon and Bretagne, Défense de la France became the underground paper with the highest circulation, with 450,000 copies per day as of January 1944.

In March 1944, after multiple moves, the newspaper was housed in a three-story industrial building on rue Jean-Dolent, behind La Santé Prison in the 14th arrondissement of Paris, with "Big Margot", a six-ton "double-jesus" machine, a linotype, a paper cutter, and a supply of paper, gasoline, food, water and two tons of coal for the foundry.

Le Franc-Tireur 

Franc-Tireur was a movement of the French Resistance founded in Lyon in November 1940 under the name , and renamed  in December 1941.

 is also the name of the movement's underground newspaper, which printed thirty-seven issues between December 1941 and August 1944. It became one of the chief newspapers of the Resistance, and continued to be published until 1957 after being renamed "Franc-Tireur" at Liberation, with the motto: "In the vanguard of the Republic." From 1957 to 1959, it had the title  and then  from 1959 to 1972. 

Under the aegis of Jean Moulin, the movement merged with Libération-sud and Combat to create the new Mouvements Unis de la Résistance (MUR).

 is a movement in the southern zone that has the most roots in Lyon. Founded in 1941 by a group of men from various backgrounds, it is a movement of personalities with the same political sensitivity, opposition to the armistice and, from the outset, to the Marshal Pétain himself.

Birth of the movement 

The initiators of the movement met at home or during card games at the Café .

They and a few others got together at the end of November 1940 and founded a movement they called "" whose mission was to fight against government propaganda and to mobilize against defeat and the authoritarian order which was taking hold. The group began by writing leaflets against the Nazis and Pétain, which were limited to small numbers of hand-typed copies due to lack of funds.

Birth of the paper 

The group had its first wave of success with the arrival of Jean-Pierre Lévy, an Alsatian refugee who brought a ronéo in the spring of 1941 and launched the idea of expanding its influence by publishing a real newspaper.

With the support of the printer , 6000 copies of the first issue were published in December 1941. They were printed on four pages of 21 x 27.5 cm (8 1/2 x 11 inch) format. The title "Franc-Tireur" is an allusion to the groups of volunteers who formed outside the normal military framework to defend their country and the Republic in the Franco-Prussian War. The tone of articles was humorous (the newspaper's ironic subtitle was, "monthly as far as possible, and by the grace of the Marshal's Police". then "monthly in spite of the Gestapo and the Vichy police" and took an offensive tone against the Marshal and the Germans. The main themes were opposition to the new order and the occupying Germans, denunciation of their misdeeds, and the call to resistance by all people of good will. Issue number one ended with the words, "There is only one task: to resist, to organize.".

L'Humanité 

On 27 August 1939, the Édouard Daladier government banned publication of L'Humanité after it approved the German-Soviet Pact.

L'Humanité then appeared clandestinely for five years (383 issues of 200,000 copies) and refrained from attacking the Germans until August 1940. The newspaper reappeared openly once more on 21 August 1944, during the Liberation of Paris.

The clandestine issue of 20 May 1941 contained an appeal of the French Communist Party (PCF) concerning the creation of the National Front for the Struggle for the Liberation and Independence of France:

National Front publications 

The National Front published numerous national and local clandestine newspapers and flyers.
From the spring of 1943 to the Liberation, 79 publications were published.
In 1944-1945 they published, according to an internal French Communist Party (PCF) source, "Seventeen dailies, one million sales. three weeklies: La Marseillaise (Île-de-France), France d'abord, Action. Five literary weeklies, 35 periodicals (weeklies) in the provinces.".

Among them, were:
 Les Lettres Françaises
Founded in October 1941 by Jacques Decour and Jean Paulhan, 25 issues were published. Les Lettres françaises appeared after Liberation, until 1972.
 L’ (104 issues, from November 1940 o October 1944), headed by Georges Politzer, Jacques Solomon (son-in-law of Paul Langevin) and Jacques Decour ;
 Le Patriote du Sud-Ouest, organ of the National Front in Toulouse; a daily at Liberation, its director was then  and was among its young coworkers Pierre Gamarra;

They also published books and brochures, such as a book about the Oradour-sur-Glane massacre.

Libération 

The underground paper  was the voice of the Resistance movement Libération-Sud.
It was launched in July 1941 by Raymond Aubrac and Emmanuel d'Astier de La Vigerie. It became one of the most important and widely distributed of all Resistance newspapers.
 reappeared openly in regular publication at the Liberation of France in August 1944.

In autumn 1942, Jules Meurillon was named in charge of the propaganda and distribution service of the organization and successfully increased the annual circulation of Libération to over 200,000 copies by August 1944.

This paper published by Resistance movement , is the same paper that was reestablished in 1973 by Jean-Paul Sartre and Serge July.

Témoignage chrétien 

On 16 November 1941 in Lyon, Jesuit priest Father Pierre Chaillet secretly published the first  ("Christian Testimony Notes"). Entitled, "France, beware of losing your soul", in the form of a small pamphlet (hence the name). It contained a vibrant appeal to oppose Nazism in the name of Christian values. It was entirely written by Father Gaston Fessard. "Christian Testimony" was originally due to be called "Catholic Testimony", but due to ecumenism and following the participation of Protestants in the secret cell initially made up of Jesuits theologians from the Theologate of Fourvière (Lyon), the adjective "Catholic" was changed to "Christian".

It was printed secretly by a printer from Lyon, who ended up deported, and died.

In fact, the basis for 's opposition to Nazism is the Gospel and Christian ideals. 

La Vie ouvrière 

Prohibited from publication in 1939,  reappeared as an underground paper in February 1940. In the early days of the occupation, Benoît Frachon, André Tollet, Eugène Hénaff, and a few other union activists from the former United General Confederation of Labor, excluded from the General Confederation of Labor in September 1939, who had escaped the search by the French police, relaunched the newspaper. Two hundred twenty-three issues were published throughout the occupation, focusing on daily life: cost of living, food shortages, supply problems, low salaries, and so on. It called for struggle, union reunification of unions, and fought against internal division. It denounced employers who had largely sunk into collaboration with the occupiers, and reported regularly about the struggles taking place in business.

Other titles 

Others include , which published 20 issues of two- to three hundred copies, the first eight of which were under the name . It stopped publishing early in 1941.. In issue number one, on 13 August, they ran an editorial about their goals:

On 7 May 1945, they published a "special victory edition", and the next day, they ran a story about the joy in Guérande after they learned of the liberation the day before at 4:30 pm. The last issue came out 10 May 1945 after the electricity came back on, once again allowing the populace to hear the news live from Radio London, and no longer needing to read a printed account of what the radio had broadcast the day before.

Fiction publishing
A small number of underground presses were also active in printing illegal books and works of literature. The most notable example of this was Le Silence de la mer by Jean Bruller published illegally in Paris in 1942. Its publisher, "Les Éditions de Minuit", became a successful commercial literary publisher in post-war France.

See also 

 Brazzaville Conference
 Allies of World War II
 Foreign policy of Charles de Gaulle
 Foreign relations of Vichy France
 Free France
 French Fourth Republic
 French Third Republic
 Military Administration in France
 German occupation of France during World War II
 Arbeiter und Soldat
 Les Lettres Françaises
 La Voix du Nord
 Provisional Government of the French Republic
 Underground media in German-occupied Europe
 World War II censorship in France

See also the French category Journal clandestin de la Résistance française

References 

Notes

Footnotes

Sources

 

 

 

 

 

 .

 

 

 

 

 

 

 

 

 

 

 

 

 

 

 

 

  

 

 

  

 

 

 .

 .

Further reading 

 .

External links 

 the student press can be accessed at the website of the Conservatory of Student Memories, notably almost the entire run of the resistance paper .
 

 

1940 in France
1941 in France
1942 in France
1943 in France
1944 in France
Defunct mass media in France
French resistance publications
French-language communist newspapers
French-language newspapers
German occupation of France during World War II
News media in France
Newspapers published in France
Vichy France
World War II political leaders